The Disneyland Paris Run Weekend is an annual half marathon and weekend race series held every third weekend of September in Marne-la-Vallée, near Paris held by runDisney, a race series and division of Disney Sports Enterprises.

The half-marathon weekend currently (as of 2019) includes a 5K, a 10K and a Half Marathon, as well as the 31K, 36K, and Castle to Chateau Challenge.

History

In 2016 the run weekend was launched for Disneyland Resort Paris. It was called the Disneyland Paris Half Marathon Weekend. The first halfmarathon, run in September 2016, featured  8,595 runners. The weekend also launched the 5K and the RunDisney Kids Races. It was the debut of the Castle to Chateau Challenge.

A 10K was added in 2017. A theme for the weekend was added. The Bibbidi Bobbidi Boo Challenge was added for the people who ran 31K, by running the 10K and the halfmarathon. At 25 September 2017 the name of the weekend was changed in the Disneyland Paris Magic Run Weekend.

In 2018 the 36K Challenge was added. At 24 September 2019 the weekend got renamed in the Disneyland Paris Run Weekend.

In September 2019, Disneyland Paris announced that the parks would host a Princess Run weekend in May 2020, similar as to what RunDisney organizes in Walt Disney World. The weekend would have launched the 5K and the  8K Princess Run.  Both the Princess Run Weekend and the Disneyland Paris Run Weekend were cancelled because of the COVID-19 pandemic.

Overview

Disneyland Paris Run Weekend

Disneyland Paris Princess Run

Races

Challenges

Winners

Half marathon

References

External links
 

Road running competitions
Half marathons in France